The 2010–11 season was North Queensland Fury's second, and final, season in the Hyundai A-League

Players

First team squad

 

 

 * Injury replacement player for Matt Ham.

Injury replacement list

Note: Sebastian Usai replaced Jerrad Tyson on the short term deal after he was called up for the U23 National side.

Transfers

In

Out

Note:  Michael Marrone had initially signed with the Fury but pulled out on his deal.

Key dates
20 February 2010: Former employee at the Fury Doug Kingston sues the club for $372,500 over a contract breach. An agreement is reached five days later by both parties in Supreme Court.
3 March 2010: North Queensland Fury’s future is put into disarray when sole owner Don Matheson withdraws his support to the club.
31 March 2010: North Queensland Fury is saved by various local businessmen and by the Townsville City Council.
6 April 2010: Manager, Ian Ferguson, leaves the club to join Perth Glory as an assistant coach.
27 April 2010: Former marquee player for the Fury, Robbie Fowler, officially joins Perth Glory as their marquee player.
14 May 2010: North Queensland Fury sign former A-League player, Stuart McLaren, as an assistant coach.
7 June 2010: The Fury sign Frantisek Straka as head coach on a one-year contract.
10 June 2010: Rabieh Krayem is announced as the new CEO.
29 July 2010: The club announces Ufuk Talay as the Captain and Gareth Edds as Vice-Captain for the upcoming season.
5 August 2010: The club announces Mission Australia as one of the major sponsors for the next three seasons as well as a three-year sponsorship deal with People Resourcing.
17 September 2010: The CEO Circle is signed on as a sleeve sponsor.
21 January 2011: North Queensland Fury suffer the worst defeat in A-League history going down 8–1 to Adelaide United.

Matches

Pre-season fixtures

2010–11 Hyundai A-League fixtures

Notes

Statistics
Last updated on 19 February 2010.
(Substitute appearances in brackets)

References 

2010-11
2010–11 A-League season by team